The Armored March is the first EP by Christian metal band Oh, Sleeper. It was released in 2006 through 1x1 Music. The year following its release, Oh, Sleeper signed to Solid State Records and all of the tracks included on the EP were re-recorded for their debut album When I Am God, which was released in 2007.

A music video was produced for the song "We Are the Archers".

Track listing

Personnel
Oh, Sleeper
Micah Kinard - lead vocals, programming
Shane Blay - lead guitar, clean vocals
James Erwin - rhythm guitar
Lucas Starr - bass guitar
Ryan Conley - drums

References

External links 
[ Billboard.com]

2006 debut EPs
Oh, Sleeper albums